Rock Paper Scissors is a 2008 studio album by Canadian hip hop artist Noah23, released on Legendary Entertainment and Plague Language. A music video was produced for "Fame".

Critical reception
Alan Ranta of PopMatters gave the album 7 stars out of 10, saying: "Regardless of the current state, history will remember Noah23." Addi Stewart of Now said: "You make your own meanings out of this kind of madman genius rap, and Rock Paper Scissors is a winner if you are up for investing a little imagination."

Track listing

References

External links
 Rock Paper Scissors at Bandcamp
 

2008 albums
Noah23 albums
Albums produced by Factor (producer)